Antonio Soto Sánchez (born 12 June 1964) is a Mexican politician affiliated with the Party of the Democratic Revolution. As of 2014 he served as Senator of the LVIII and LIX Legislatures of the Mexican Congress representing Michoacán and as Deputy of the LX Legislature.

References

1961 births
Living people
Politicians from Michoacán
Members of the Senate of the Republic (Mexico)
Members of the Chamber of Deputies (Mexico)
Members of the Congress of Michoacán
Party of the Democratic Revolution politicians
20th-century Mexican politicians
21st-century Mexican politicians